Elaphrus punctatus is a species of ground beetle in the subfamily Elaphrinae. It was described by Victor Motschulsky in 1844.

References

Elaphrinae
Beetles described in 1844